Congenital erosive and vesicular dermatosis is a cutaneous condition characterized by generalized erosions, vesicles, crusting and ‘scalded skin-like’ erythematous areas affecting up to 75% of the body surface area.

See also 
 Melanotic neuroectodermal tumor of infancy
 List of cutaneous conditions

References 

Cutaneous congenital anomalies